Parking In Motion (PIM) was a parking technology company based in Santa Monica, California. Parking In Motion was founded by Sam Friedman (CEO) and Alexander Israel (COO) in 2008.

PIM was a provider of dynamic and real time parking data, which holds partnerships with app developers, map makers, and GPS navigation companies. PIM operates a database containing over 20,000 public parking lots in over 300 cities. These lots cover the United States, Canada, Europe and Australia.

iPhone App

PIM's consumer product is an iPhone app, released on April 14, 2011. It allows users to access the PIM database mobily as well as reserve and prepay for parking through affiliates.

QR Code
In May 2011, Parking In Motion debuted its QR Code campaign at the International Parking Institute (IPI) conference in Philadelphia, Pennsylvania in its effort to "make parking fun". The campaign utilizes Mobile tagging to try to encourage drivers to use PIM's services and associated lots.

References

IOS software